Hepcidin is a protein that in humans is encoded by the HAMP gene. Hepcidin is a key regulator of the entry of iron into the circulation in mammals.

During conditions in which the hepcidin level is abnormally high, such as inflammation, serum iron falls due to iron trapping within macrophages and liver cells and decreased gut iron absorption. This typically leads to anemia due to an inadequate amount of serum iron being available for developing red blood cells. When the hepcidin level is  abnormally low such as in hemochromatosis, iron overload occurs due to increased ferroportin mediated iron efflux from storage and increased gut iron absorption.

Structure 
Hepcidin exists as a preprohormone (84 amino acids), prohormone (60 amino acids), and hormone (25 amino acids). Twenty- and 22-amino acid metabolites of hepcidin also exist in the urine. Deletion of 5 N-terminal amino acids results in loss of function. The conversion of prohepcidin to hepcidin is mediated by the prohormone convertase furin. This conversion may be regulated by alpha-1 antitrypsin.

Hepcidin is a tightly folded polypeptide with 32% beta sheet character and a hairpin structure stabilized by 4 disulfide bonds. The structure of hepcidin has been determined through solution NMR.  NMR studies showed a new model for hepcidin: at ambient temperatures, the protein interconverts between two conformations, which could be individually resolved by temperature variation. The solution structure of hepcidin was determined at 325 K and 253 K in supercooled water.  X-ray analysis of a co-crystal with Fab revealed a structure similar to the high-temperature NMR structure.

Function 

Hepcidin is a regulator of iron metabolism. It inhibits iron transport by binding to the iron export channel ferroportin which is located in the basolateral plasma membrane of gut enterocytes and the plasma membrane of reticuloendothelial cells (macrophages), ultimately resulting in ferroportin breakdown in lysosomes. It has been shown that hepcidin is able to bind to the central cavity of ferroportin, thus occluding iron export from the cell. This suggests that hepcidin is able to regulate iron export independently of ferroportin endocytosis and ubiquitination, and is thus quickly inducible and reversible.  In enterocytes, this prevents iron transmission into the hepatic portal system, thereby reducing dietary iron absorption. In macrophages, ferroportin inhibition causes iron sequestration within the cell. Increased hepcidin activity is partially responsible for reduced iron availability seen in anemia of chronic inflammation, such as kidney failure and that may explain why patient with end stage renal failure may not respond to oral iron replacement.

Any one of several mutations in hepcidin result in juvenile hemochromatosis. The majority of juvenile hemochromatosis cases are due to mutations in hemojuvelin. Mutations in TMPRSS6 can cause anemia through dysregulation of Hepcidin.

Hepcidin has strong antimicrobial activity against Escherichia coli strain ML35P and Neisseria cinerea and weaker antimicrobial activity against Staphylococcus epidermidis, Staphylococcus aureus and Streptococcus agalactiae. It is also active against the fungus Candida albicans, but has no activity against Pseudomonas aeruginosa.

Regulation
Hepcidin synthesis and secretion by the liver is by iron stores, inflammation (hepcidin is an acute phase reactant), hypoxia, and erythropoiesis. In response to large iron stores, production of Bone Morphogenic Protein (BMP) is induced, which binds to receptors on hepatocytes and induces hepcidin expression via the SMAD pathway. Inflammation causes an increase in hepcidin production by releasing the signaling molecule interleukin-6 (IL-6), which binds to a receptor and upregulates the HAMP gene via the JAK/STAT pathway. Hypoxia negatively regulates hepcidin production via production the transcription factor hypoxia-inducible factor (HIF), which under normal conditions is degraded by von Hippel-Lindau (VHL) and prolyl dehydrogenase (PHD). When hypoxia is induced, however, PHD is inactivated, thus allowing HIF to down-regulate hepcidin production. Erythropoiesis decreases hepcidin production via production of erythropoietin (EPO), which has been shown to down-regulate hepcidin production.

Severe anaemia is associated with low hepcidin levels, even in the presence of inflammation. Erythroferrone, produced in erythroblasts, has been identified as inhibiting hepcidin and so providing more iron for hemoglobin synthesis in situations such as stress erythropoiesis.

Vitamin D has been shown to decrease hepcidin, in cell models looking at transcription and when given in large doses to human volunteers.  Optimal function of hepcidin may be predicated upon the adequate presence of vitamin D in the blood.

History 
The peptide was initially reported in January 1998 by Valore,E., Park,C. and Ganz,T. in the SWISS-PROT database as entry P81172 and named hepcidin after it was observed that it was produced in the liver ("hep-") and appeared to have bactericidal properties ("-cide" for "killing"). Detailed descriptions were published in 2000-2001.  Although it is primarily synthesized in the liver, smaller amounts are synthesised in other tissues such as fat cells.

Hepcidin was first discovered in human urine and serum Soon after this discovery, researchers discovered that hepcidin production in mice increases in conditions of iron overload as well as in inflammation. Genetically modified mice engineered to overexpress hepcidin died shortly after birth with severe iron deficiency, again suggesting a central and not redundant role in iron regulation. The first evidence that linked hepcidin to the clinical condition known as the anemia of inflammation came from the lab of Nancy Andrews in Boston when researchers looked at tissue from two patients with liver tumors with a severe microcytic anemia that did not respond to iron supplements. The tumor tissue appeared to be overproducing hepcidin, and contained large quantities of hepcidin mRNA. Removing the tumors surgically cured the anemia.Taken together, these discoveries suggested that hepcidin regulates the absorption of iron into the body.

Clinical significance 

There are many diseases where failure to adequately absorb iron contributes to iron deficiency and iron deficiency anaemia. The treatment will depend on the hepcidin levels that are present, as oral treatment will be unlikely to be effective if hepcidin is blocking enteral absorption, in which cases parenteral iron treatment would be appropriate. Studies have found that measuring hepcidin would be of benefit to establish optimal treatment, although as this is not widely available, C-reactive protein (CRP) is used as a surrogate marker.

β-thalassemia, one of the most common congenital anemias, arises from partial or complete lack of β-globin synthesis. Excessive iron absorption is one of the main features of β-thalassemia and can lead to severe morbidity and mortality. The serial analyses of β-thalassemic mice indicate hemoglobin levels decreases over time, while the concentration of iron in the liver, spleen, and kidneys markedly increases. The overload of iron is associated with low levels of hepcidin.  Patients with β-thalassemia also have low hepcidin levels. The observations led researchers to hypothesize that more iron is absorbed in β-thalassemia than is required for erythropoiesis. Increasing expression of hepcidin in β-thalassemic mice limits iron overload, and also decreases formation of insoluble membrane-bound globins and reactive oxygen species, and improves anemia. Mice with increased hepcidin expression also demonstrated an increase in the lifespan of their red cells, reversal of ineffective erythropoiesis and splenomegaly, and an increase in total hemoglobin levels. From these data, researchers suggested that therapeutics to increase hepcidin levels or act as hepcidin agonists could help treat the abnormal iron absorption in individuals with β-thalassemia and related disorders.  In later studies in mice, erythroferrone has been suggested to be the factor that is responsible for the hepcidin suppression. Correcting hepcidin and iron levels in these mice did not improve their anemia.

References

Further reading

External links 
 
 Intrinsic LifeSciences - Hepcidin Research Facility, The BioIron Company
 Hepcidinanalysis.com - Service for Hepcidin measurements: Scientific Research, Patients and Clinical Trials
 Protein Data Bank Page
 PDBe-KB provides an overview of all the structure information available in the PDB for Human Hepcidin

Iron metabolism
Blood proteins
Hepatology
Peptide hormones
Genes on human chromosome 19